The Marching Pride of North Alabama, is the official marching band of the University of North Alabama. The band is the largest organization on campus, and performs at all North Alabama Lions football home games, as well as local parades and high school competition exhibitions across the state.

History

Beginnings
The band began as the Tri-Cities Band directed by  Dr.William Presser in 1947. UNA (then called Florence State Teachers College), started its first official college band in 1949, when President E.B. Norton brought football back to the campus.  Presser took the position of choral director at the school, and Dr. Robert Nye, a new music teacher, became the band's director.   Twenty-seven students, out of the 1,400 attending the school, formed the first marching band.

Its first rehearsal took place on September 24, 1949, and performed the show Saturday, October, 22 at the FSTC/Livingston (now the University of West Alabama) game.

1950s
During the summer of 1950, uniforms were ordered.  Dr. Wayne Christeson became band director when  Dr. Nye left FSTC to take a position at the University of Oregon.  The band began practicing on the practice field, which is still in use today on what is now Pine Street.  He also saw the band grow to forty-four members in 1954. Florence State Teachers College became Florence State College in 1957.   In 1961, when Dr. Christeson decided to devote his time to being chair of the Department of Music. 

Mr. Kenneth Large was hired as the new band director. When he started, there were only 17 band students, but he soon raised the number of the band to 50. students.

1960s
In December 1961, the band made its first appearance in the Birmingham Veterans Day Parade.  A job offer drew Mr. Large away from Florence State in 1966, 
Arthur Theil took over the Florence State College's band in 1965, and named the band the Pride of Dixie. The band had numbered 70   when Large left but only 46 when   Theil took over; his second year,  it had increased to 80.  Florence State College   Florence State University in 1968. After practicing in the Stone Lodge, or Band Lodge, for twenty years the band moved to its new home, the Lurleen Wallace Fine Arts Center in 1969.

1970s
In 1970, Theil left the school,  and Dr. Frank McArthur was hired to direct the bands.  Under his direction, the band won the Birmingham Veterans Day Parade best university band contest on October 22, 1973.  The school changed name again to change from FSU to the University of North Alabama in 1975. In 1975, Dr.  James K. Simpson, previously assistant band director, took over the position in 1975.   In 1976, the band received an invitation to perform in the Blue/Gray Bowl game.    In 1978, Dr. Edd Jones took over as director of bands.

Today
Dr, Lloyd Jones, the current director, began assisting with the band in 1996. Members of the concert and jazz band performed at the Alabama Music Educators Association conference at Auburn University in the spring of 1997. The marching band has made twenty-four consecutive NCAA Division II National Football Championship Game appearances.  Dr. Edd Jones retired August 1, 2000 as director of bands and continued to teach in the department in an adjunct  capacity until his death in 2020. 

The North Alabama Marching Pride performed in Alabama Governor Bob Riley's Second Inaugural Parade on January 15, 2007 in Montgomery. They also performed in the Inaugural Parade for Alabama Governor Robert J. Bentley on January 19, 2015.

Since 2011, the North Alabama Marching Pride has performed exhibitions for Bands of America. They have performed in Atlanta and Indianapolis for these events.

Organization
 
The band performs at games throughout the football season. Its affiliates,  The Majorettes, Lionettes (dance line), and Color Guard are a part of each halftime show.

The UNA Lionettes are the dance line which performs as a part of the North Alabama Marching Pride Marching Band; the UNA Majorettes are considered an integral part of the band; the UNA Color Guard provides visual impact for the band.

The Jazz Band is a select part of the band that   represents UNA in a number of performances, including an annual concert tour of area high schools.

Additional performing opportunities are provided by the Jazz Combo, the Percussion Ensemble, the Brass Ensemble and the Woodwind Ensemble. All performing groups at the University are a part of the school curriculum, and members receive academic credit. The groups are supervised and taught by experienced and interested faculty members.

References
Hollman, Holly (1998).  A History of the UNA Band: a once in a halftime experience (University of North Alabama's North Alabama Marching Pride).  Rose Publishing Company, Humboldt, Tennessee.

External links
 University of North Alabama Bands web site
 UNA Fight Song as performed by the North Alabama Marching Pride Download

Big South Conference marching bands
Florence–Muscle Shoals metropolitan area
University of North Alabama
Musical groups established in 1949
1949 establishments in Alabama